Despite being a highly developed and modern society, Japan has high levels of gender inequality. In 2015, the country had a per-capita income of US$38,883, ranking 22nd of the 188 countries, and No. 18 in the Human Development Index. Its Gender Inequality Index rank was 19th on the 2019 report, which is relatively low for developed nations. The disparity between income and gender inequality is due to the persistence of gender norms in Japanese society. Gender-based inequality manifests in various aspects of social life in Japan, from the family to political representation, playing particular roles in employment opportunities, education, and income, and occurs largely as a result of differing gender roles in traditional and modern Japanese society. Inequality also lies within divorce and the marriage of same sex couples due to both a lack of protective divorce laws and the presence of restrictive marriage laws; discrimination exists outside of the law and is present in the modern day society of Japan.

Family values
Japan's family dynamics have historically been defined by a two-person, female housewife or caregiver role and a male income-earner role, a historically common division of labor between the sexes. After Japan's involvement in World War II ended, the resulting Japanese Constitution included Article 24, "the Gender Equality Clause," which was introduced to steer the country towards gender equality. However, deeply-embedded family and gender norms led to resistance among citizens, and the culture remained largely the same as of 2009.

It was not until the mid-1970s that Japanese women began to play a larger role in the paid economy. Japanese men, however, generally did not step in to play a larger role in the house. Studies have shown that there is a negative correlation between the number of hours worked by fathers in their jobs and the amount of housework (including childcare) that the father provides. After paid work, the father would come home, spending most of his time eating or in non-social interactions such as watching TV with his family. This led to the term "Japan Inc.," synonymous with males committing their life to their job while in a long-term relationship.

Another term that became popular in Japan was the "relationship-less society", describing how men's long work hours left little or no time for them to bond with their families. Japanese society came to be one of isolation within the household, since there was only enough time after work to care for oneself, excluding the rest of the family. This held especially true for families who wished to have a second child. Due to corporations and work regulation laws, men of all ages in large firms are forced to prioritize work over the rest of their life. The limited amount of help from their male spouses leaves women with the majority of household chores.

Divorce 
In Japan, the process of getting a divorce is considered a personal family issue in which the Japanese government does not get extremely involved in except to provide legal papers that need to be consensually signed by both partners in the marriage. Partners have the option to get divorced through the family court system or through simple registration at their ward. Divorce in the late 70's in Japan was usually due to adultery, financial problems, and incompatibility, however divorces now are most often due to incompatibility with personalities followed by abuse and violence by the husband. In cases that involve domestic violence or abuse, most often women are left at a disadvantage, being left with limited economic opportunities post-divorce due to discrimination and unequal distributions of assets.

LGBTQ+ Marriage Rights and Violence in Law 

Same sex marriage is not legal in Japan, however same sex unions are allowed and are facilitated through adult adoption and partnership certificates. The culture of 'eroticized violence' is quite present in Japan which sexualizes and mistreats the female body and influences laws that encourages conformity and homogeneity in the legal restraints and lawmaking surrounding sexual violence. These inequalities affect many aspects of individuals who do not identify with heterosexual marriage norms including social and legal discrimination in the work place, education, healthcare, and housing, with the legal discrimination stemming from the Koseki. There have been changes to try and fight social discrimination such as the Japanese Ministry of Health enforcing work place regulations against income and social discrimination of someone due to their sexual orientation.

Social Stratification Mobility Survey
The Social Stratification and Mobility (SSM) survey was first conducted in 1955 and has been conducted every decade since. The first survey aimed to study Japan's economic foundation. A large scale survey like the SSM has its problems: Many local issues go unnoticed and inequality stays hidden within households until a more focused survey can unveil more. However, even this survey was a major step toward national awareness around issues of gender equality.

In the fourth survey, completed in 1985, there was a significant recorded movement towards equality. Up until it, women were only counted as housewives and family business labor (help with family-owned businesses, like farm work) did not count toward measures of economic mobility. It is here that we finally start to see a shift toward a more equal culture.

The Equal Employment Opportunity Law

With national surveys finally including women, the Japanese government introduced the Equal Employment Opportunity Law (EEOL). Before its enactment, women could generally only get labor-intensive jobs in poor working conditions, mostly on farms or in unsafe factories. Most other women found jobs as secretaries or assistants. Post-EEOL Japan began to see blue collar jobs fill up with machines, allowing women to have better opportunities elsewhere in society.

The Equal Employment Opportunity Law aimed to create equality within the workforce for people of all genders. Despite these goals, however, women were still being discriminated against in every field. Despite constant discrimination, modern Japan continues to push forward with support from the EEOL (and other equality laws like the Convention on the Elimination of All Forms of Discrimination against Women (CEDAW)) toward safer and better-paying jobs for women. In 2014, Prime Minister Shinzo Abe placed five women into political roles within his cabinet. Of these, only three kept their positions due to scandals related to workplace sexism.

Gender Inequality Index
The Gender Inequality Index (GII) has Japan ranked as 19th out of 188 countries in 2019. The GII measures three things: reproductive health, empowerment and the labor market. For this index, where 0 represents full equality and 1 is total inequality, Japan places at 0.116. 

The Gender Inequality Index confirms that Japan has room for improvement. The country still lacks female voices in parliament, compared to similar Asian countries: Japan ranks as fourth lowest within the 51 highest developed countries. In terms of women in the labor force, Japan has the sixth lowest score. However, Japan ranks fairly well when it comes to adolescent birth rate and the percentage of the female population with some secondary education. Overall, the country is ranked among the countries with the lowest GII because of its high scores in reproductive healthcare and women's education levels.

History of Gender Inequality in Education 

In Japanese society today, there is practically no gender gap in education, and in fact gender inequality has been overall declining in Japan, however Japan has not historically been this way. When structuralized education was in early modernization, there were huge limitations for female opportunity in all education levels: elementary attendance was low, secondary education opportunities were limited, and higher education was not an option. However, things began to change slowly throughout the 19th century and continued to change through the end of WWII for equal educational opportunities. After WWII, gender equality in education along with democratization, sexual equality, and  change in the employment structure were at full speed and prompted many changes towards a more equal society.

Gender roles through traditions and modern society
Gender roles in Japan are deeply entwined with the East Asian country's religious and cultural history. Japan's most popular philosophy, Confucianism, enforces gendered rules relating to fashion and public behavior. For instance, from a young age, Japanese men are taught the importance of professional success, higher education, honoring the family name, and providing for the family. In the Confucian tradition, women only receive education through middle school, and are taught to focus on being respectful, learning to cook, and taking care of children. Under this framework, women are not supposed to have a paying job.

It was not until 1900 that women in Japan were allowed to earn a college degree. Women with a career at the expense of focusing on a family have become a target for blame regarding Japan's unusually low birthrate. While the cultural understanding of women's roles in society has changed, that of men's has not – honoring the family name and being a breadwinner are still deeply instilled priorities.

Gender gap in employment and wages

The gender gap in employment and wages is becoming an increasingly serious problem, with Japan being the fastest aging country in the OECD. To maintain its economy, the government must take measures to maintain productivity. While women hold 45.4 percent of Japan's bachelor degrees, they only make up 18.2 percent of the labor force, and only 2.1 percent of employers are women. 

There are several theories explaining women's low workforce participation. One points to the importance of family in Japanese society. This emphasis on the male-breadwinner model persists because government tax policies and company benefits are not as beneficial for women, especially women with families. There is a government policy that guarantees healthcare and pensions for spouses who make less than 1.3 million yen, or about $11,500, thus discouraging couples from both working. Japanese companies have extensive benefits for men because they are expected to provide for their families at home. Job salaries and benefits are also heavily influenced by tenure and seniority, making it hard for women with families to advance in regular employment. Furthermore, three-generation households, which includes the grandparents, parents, and children, are still very common in Japan. In these, the husband's salary and benefits are expected to provide for the whole family while the wife stays home and cares for the elderly and children.

There is also a large gap in wages between men and women. In 2005, Japan had a gender wage gap of 32.8 percent, which decreased to 25.7 percent in 2017. Japan has the third highest wage gap in the OECD. The country's long work hours create an environment that reinforces the wage gap because there is a disproportional difference between how much time men and women spend on paid and unpaid work. On average, women spend 5.5 hours on unpaid housework per day, whereas men only spend one hour. Men do very little housework in Japan, and this is part of the gendered labor division. The Japanese prioritization of seniority hurts the women who want to have children first, as promotions will be awarded much later in life. The number of women in upper-level positions (managers, CEOs, and politicians, and the like) is rather low. Women only make up 3.4 percent of seats in Japanese companies' board of directors. According to scholars, to remove barriers against women, the government must introduce more women- and family-friendly policies.

Labor market segregation is associated with the gender wage gap. After World War II, the state deliberately made decisions to divide the labor pool by gender. Findings show that majority-female workplaces have 5.1% lower wages than majority-male workplaces, for all genders. This percentage only accounts for full-time workers and does not account for part-time female workers who may also be raising children.

Historically, men dominated society was normal in general, and a part of the “Japanese culture.” Originally, politicians were mainly men, and they held the power all to their hands. Therefore, there is distinctly a perception in the political workplace, but after the late 1980s, people gradually started to embrace the importance of women needed in the political aspect.

An alternative theory, the Compensating Wage Differential hypothesis, states that women are not forced into these jobs per se, but instead that they pick and choose their occupations based on the benefits package that each provide. From work availability to health compensation, women may choose to have a lower wage to have certain job benefits. A study by Wei-hsin Yu shows that there is also a connection between wage raises if you are currently working in an environment that includes a majority of women.
A competing theory from Mary Brinton suggests that the government is structured around devices that disallow women to find "good jobs." A fourth key theory comes from Higuchi Keiko, which claims that changes in public policy are needed to encourage gender diversity in the workplace. Keiko argues that existing government policies disincentivize women from working. One such law pushed in the 1960s was called hitozukuri policy, or human-making policy, which burdened women with the responsibility to reproduce a new generation capable of economic success.

Other 
In 2018, it was revealed that several university medical schools, Tokyo Medical University, Juntendo University, and Kitasato University, favored male applicants by using different passing marks for men and women. In Japan, the ratios of female doctors compared to male doctors are relatively low, and the overall numbers of them are only 21.1%. This shows that Japan has a major gender gap in the medical field, and falls behind amongst all the G7 countries.

See also 
 Gender Equality Bureau
 Family policy in Japan
 Feminism in Japan
 Kyariaūman
 Women in Japan

References

Social inequality
Japan
Social issues in Japan
Gender in Japan
Women in Japan
Women's rights in Japan
Discrimination in Japan